Journey of Hope is a 1990 film directed by Xavier Koller. It tells the story of a Kurdish rural family from Turkey trying to illegally emigrate to Switzerland, a country they know only from a postcard. The film is a co-production between companies in Switzerland, Turkey and the United Kingdom.

The film won the 1990 Academy Award for Best Foreign Language Film. The film was submitted to the Academy of Motion Picture Arts and Sciences (Los Angeles, USA) by the Swiss Government, resulting in the second Oscar win ever for Switzerland.

Plot
In a village in eastern Turkey, tales of the economic success of Turks in Switzerland inspire Haydar to convince his wife Meryem that they must go. He sells their livestock and small plot of land in exchange for passage for two. He wants to leave their seven children in the care of the eldest and his parents; his father advises him to take one son to be educated in Europe, as economic insurance. The three set off for Istanbul, Milan, and Switzerland, stowing away on a ship. At Lake Como, they pay the rest of their money to unprincipled men who abandon them at an Alpine pass before a blizzard. Father and son are separated from Meryem. Will anyone reach the land of promise?

Cast
 Necmettin Çobanoglu: Haydar Sener 
 Nur Sürer: Meryem
 Emin Sivas: Mehmet Ali 
 Yaman Okay: Turkmen 
 Erdinc Akbas: Adama 
 Mathias Gnädinger: Ramser 
 Dietmar Schönherr: Massimo
 Andrea Zogg: Christen
 Erdal Merdan: Aldemir

See also
 List of submissions to the 63rd Academy Awards for Best Foreign Language Film
 List of Swiss submissions for the Academy Award for Best Foreign Language Film

References

External links

1990 films
Swiss German-language films
1990s Turkish-language films
1990 drama films
British drama films
Swiss drama films
Turkish drama films
Films about immigration
Best Foreign Language Film Academy Award winners
Films shot in Turkey
Turkish multilingual films
Films directed by Xavier Koller
1990 multilingual films
1990s British films